Roșiori is a commune in Bacău County, Western Moldavia, Romania. It is composed of six villages: Misihănești, Negușeni, Poieni, Roșiori, Valea Mare and Valea Mică.

References

Communes in Bacău County
Localities in Western Moldavia